Kudassanad is a village near Pandalam in the State of Kerala in India. Geographically it is situated in the eastern ending of Alappuzha District and western part of Pathanamthitta District. The southern end of Kudassanad is on the verge of Kollam District (in fact Kudassanad formed a part of Quilon, which was the former name of Kollam, before it was transferred to the jurisdiction of Alappuzha District). Part of Palamel Panchayat and Mavelikara Taluk, Kudassanad comes under the Mavelikara Parliamentary and Mavelikara Assembly Constituencies.

Kudassanad is encompassed by hills and valleys, paddy fields, rivulets and streams, as well as country roads that pass through rubber plantations and dales.

Location 

Kudassanad is a village that lies in the southern part (old travancore region) of Kerala, India. It is situated in the eastern end of Alappuzha District and western part of Pathanamthitta District.  Southern side of this village is very near to the Kollam District.

Administration

Kudassanad village is part of Palamel Panchayat which is under the Alappuzha District. Kudassanad forms part of the Mavelikara Parliamentary and Pandalam Assembly Constituencies. The legendary M.N. Govindan Nair, Thoppil Bhasi and K.C. George - all veterans of the Communist movement - who stood in the forefront of the Vayalar-Punnapra struggle - have represented the constituencies in the 1950s, 1960s, and 1970s.

Schools

Schools in Kudassanad include N.S.S. Higher Secondary School (run by Nair Service Society), Government Lower Primary (LP) School and St Stephen's Public School (CBSE) run by St Stephen's orthodox cathedral.

St.Stephen's Orthodox Cathedral

St. Stephen's Orthodox Cathedral, Kudassanad is one of the most famous and ancient churches in Kerala. The church was founded 340 years ago. In the first phase a thatched house was erected with bamboos and wooden blocks. In the second phase a sturdier construction was raised with bricks and mortar and in the third phase a larger brick edifice with tiled roof and extensions on both sides as well as a portico in front was put up, of which the foundation stone was laid by H.G. Pulikkottil Joseph Mar Dionysius V on 20 January 1873; it was a small church in size. As this Church also became too small for the extended worshippers a fourth phase for the modernization of the church began as H.G. Daniel Mar Philoxenos, Metropolitan of the Thumpamon Diocese, laid the foundation stone on 22 January 1972, which was consecrated by H.H. Moran Mar Baselios Mar Thoma Mathews I on 23 January 1984, during which the Catholicos christened the mount on which the church is situated at St. Stephen’s Mount. Elevated to be a Cathedral on 22 April 1984 by H.G. Daniel Mar Philoxenos, the St. Stephen’s Cathedral is one of the most historically vibrant churches in central Travancore. Holy Relics of St.Stephen from Greece is installed here.

Temples

Kudassanad is situated on the threshold of Pandalam, where Lord Ayyappa, the presiding deity of Sabarimala grew up in the Palace of the King of Pandalam. Pilgrims to Sabarimala come to Pandalam for worship at the Valiya Koickal Temple before proceeding to Sabarimala. The annual ceremony of carrying the "Sacred Ornament" (Thiruvabharanam) to adore the deity in Sabarimala is a great religious event, in which hundreds of thousands of believers participate.

Padanilam Parabrahma Temple is another temple near Kudassanad, which is just 5 km away towards the west side. Kudassanad is one of the 18 karas (territories) of Padanilam Temple. Annually, people from Kudassanad bring Nandikeshan to Padanilam Temple on MahaSivarathri day.

Infrastructure

Though a small village, Kudassanad is self-reliant in almost all fields. It has modern infrastructure and state-of-the-art services: Anganvadi, Government LP School, one English medium School run by the Malankara Orthodox Syrian Church, one LP School run by the Syro-Malankara Catholic Church and one Higher Secondary School belonging to the Nair Service Society (NSS). The Panchayat Samskarika Nilayam (Cultural Centre) takes care of the intellectual needs of the people. The general health of the population is taken care of by Mar Baselios Mission Hospital and other private and homeopathy clinics as well as by other highly qualified medical practitioners. In addition to the Post Office, the locality has several STD/ISD Booths.

Transportation

There are a number of regular government and private buses plying at an interval of 10–15 minutes to different directions. Also numerous taxis, jeeps and three-wheelers facilitate the travel needs of the general public. Daily evening markets, in addition to the two weekly markets on Tuesdays and Fridays, attract people even from distant villages. Long before globalisation came to big towns, Kudassanad had the Cable TV facilities, which can receive hundreds of national and international TV Programmes!

Temples

The natives, irrespective of caste and creed, are proud of their centuries old (Thirumani Mangalam Mahadevan) temple. Major Thirumani Mangalam Sree Mahadevar Temple is famous for the worship of Vishnu and Siva in same temple.  The surroundings are very serene and the temple itself maintains the age old structure without much changes. Kudassanad is also sanctified by the presence of the ancient centuries old  St. Stephen's Orthodox Syrian Cathedral, fondly called the Valia Palli. St. Stephen's Orthodox Cathedral is the patrimonial heritage of Kudassanad, which is one of the most famous churches in the Malankara Orthodox community in Kerala.  St. Thomas Catholic Church, consecrated in 1944, is another church of worship, besides one Guru Mandiram which is dedicated for the great Sree Narayana Guru, who taught 'One Caste, One Religion, One God for man'.

Literacy

The literacy rate of Kudassanad (50%), having a population of over 5,000 is admirable. The population density is 1144 per km2. 70 per cent of the population owns land.

Economy

Kudassanad also jealously guards the distinction of being the granary of Palamel Panchayat. Thus costly lives saving crops are damaged every year resulting in avoidable hardships to the farmers. Even on occasion the water is released, the heavy silting of the KIP canals due to lack of maintenance and clogging at different points have been affecting the free flow of water along various stretches of the canal leading to the Karingaly paddy fields extending to the geographical jurisdiction of Alappuzha and Pathanamthitta revenue divisions, comprising Kudassanad, Karimuckam Cherickal, Poozhickad, and Ulavuckad. It may be mentioned here that Basmati cultivation had successfully been initiated at the Karingaly paddy fields at the turn of the century.

In addition to rice, vegetables, tapioca, black pepper, cashew nuts, mangoes, ginger, pine apple, coconut trees, etc. are also cultivated. Milk collection and distribution centres are a great boon to the villagers. A few families practice ducks and poultry farming. Brick manufacture is done on a small scale. Rice and flourmills take care of the work formerly carried out by housewives. There is also a daily market; bars, toddy, teashops, bakeries, grocery shops, and the like help the village to be self-sufficient.

The mostly educated people, working abroad (Gulf Region, European Union, the U.S.A. and Canada) have brought fame and prosperity to the village, which has completely changed its facet, thus fondly earning the nickname "mini-Gulf".

Kudassanad's system of commercial and cooperative banking includes one nationalized bank (State Bank of India) and some other private banks, including The Catholic Syrian Bank (CSB), and Kosamattam Financiers. These banks have branch offices in Kudassanad.

Politics 

Political parties have a strong grip in the place, yet people are enough intelligent to choose representatives on their ability to satisfy the local needs than the emotional attachments to political parties.  We can’t say that Kudassanad is biased to a specific political party.

Film location 

At present, Kudassanad is the home of the film director Dr. Biju Kumar, who directed "Saira". Dr. Bijukumars film – "വീട്ടിലേക്കുള്ള വഴി" (the way home)  is awarded as the Best Malayalam Film in International Film Festival of Kerala 2010 as well as in National film Awards in 2010.

References

External links 

Blog about Kudassanad
About Pallibhgam youth Movement Kudassanad

Villages in Alappuzha district